The Yamnaya culture or the Yamna culture (lit. 'culture of pits'), also known as the Pit Grave culture or Ochre Grave culture, was a late Copper Age to early Bronze Age archaeological culture of the region between the Southern Bug, Dniester, and Ural rivers (the Pontic steppe), dating to 3300–2600 BCE. It was discovered by Vasily Gorodtsov following his archaelogical excavations near Siversky Donets in 1901-1903. Its name derives from its characteristic burial tradition:  is a Russian adjective that means 'related to pits', as these people used to bury their dead in tumuli (kurgans) containing simple pit chambers.

The people of the Yamnaya culture were the result of a genetic admixture between the descendants of Eastern European Hunter-Gatherers (EHG) and people related to hunter-gatherers from the Caucasus (CHG), an ancestral component which is often named "Steppe ancestry", with additional admixture of up to 18% from Early European Farmers. Their material culture was very similar to the Afanasevo culture of South Siberia, and the populations of both cultures are genetically indistinguishable. They lived primarily as nomads, with a chiefdom system and wheeled carts and wagons that allowed them to manage large herds.

The people of the Yamnaya culture are also closely connected to Final Neolithic cultures, which later spread throughout Europe and Central Asia, especially the Corded Ware people and the Bell Beaker culture, as well as the peoples of the Sintashta, Andronovo, and Srubnaya cultures. Back migration from Corded Ware also contributed to Sintashta and Andronovo. In these groups, several aspects of the Yamnaya culture are present. Genetic studies have also indicated that these populations derived large parts of their ancestry from the steppes.

The Yamnaya culture is identified with the late Proto-Indo-Europeans, and the Pontic-Caspian steppe is the strongest candidate for the original homeland of the Proto-Indo-European language (German, Urheimat).

Origins 

Yamnaya culture was defined by Vasily Gorodtsov in order to differentiate it from catacomb and srubnaya cultures that existed in the area but considered to be of later period. Owing to the historical distance of Yamnaya culture, and reliance on archaeological findings, debate continues as to its origin. In 1996 Pavel Dolukhanov suggested that the emergence of the Pit-Grave culture represents a social development of various local Bronze Age cultures, representing "an expression of social stratification and the emergence of chiefdom-type nomadic social structures", which in turn intensified inter-group contacts between essentially heterogeneous social groups.

The Khvalynsk culture (4700–3800 BC) (middle Volga) and the Don-based Repin culture (c. 3950–3300 BC) in the eastern Pontic-Caspian steppe, and the closely related Sredny Stog culture (c. 4500–3500 BC) in the western Pontic-Caspian steppe, preceded the Yamnaya culture (3300–2500 BC).

Further efforts to pinpoint the location came from Anthony (2007), suggesting from his research that the Yamnaya culture (3300–2600 BC) originated in the Don–Volga area at c. 3400 BC, preceded by the middle Volga-based Khvalynsk culture and the Don-based Repin culture (–3300 BC), arguing that late pottery from these two cultures can barely be distinguished from early Yamnaya pottery. Earlier continuity from eneolithic but largely hunter-gatherer Samara culture and influences from the more agricultural Dnieper–Donets II are apparent.

Alternatively, Parpola (2015) relates both the Corded ware culture and the Yamnaya culture to the late Trypillia (Tripolye) culture. He hypothesizes that "the Tripolye culture was taken over by PIE speakers by c. 4000 BC," and that in its final phase the Trypillian culture expanded to the steppes, morphing into various regional cultures which fused with the late Serednii Stih (Sredny Stog) pastoralist cultures, which, he suggests, gave rise to the Yamnaya culture. Dmytro Telegin viewed Serednii Stih and Yamna as one cultural continuum and considered Serednii Stih to be the genetic foundation of the Yamna.

The Yamnaya (Pit-grave) culture was succeeded in its western range by the Catacomb culture (2800–2200 BC); in the east, by the Poltavka culture (2700–2100 BC) at the middle Volga. These two cultures were followed by the Srubnaya culture (18th–12th century BC).

Characteristics 

The Yamnaya culture was semi-nomadic, with some agriculture practiced near rivers, and a few fortified sites, the largest of which is Mikhaylivka.

Characteristic for the culture are the burials in pit graves under kurgans (tumuli), often accompanied with animal offerings. Some graves contain large anthropomorphic stelae, with carved human heads, arms, hands, belts, and weapons. The dead bodies were placed in a supine position with bent knees and covered in ochre. Some kurgans contained "stratified sequences of graves". It has been argued that kurgan burials were rare, and reserved for special adults, who were predominantly, but not necessarily, male. Status and gender are marked by grave goods and position, and in some areas, elite individuals are buried with complete wooden wagons. Grave goods are more common in eastern Yamnaya burials, which are also characterized by a higher proportion of male burials and more male-centred rituals than western areas.

In the northern Pontic steppes were excavated the oldest wheels in the world, which may tentatively be associated with the Indo-Europeans. The Yamnaya culture had and used two-wheeled carts and four-wheeled wagons, which are thought to have been oxen-drawn at this time, and there is evidence that they rode horses.

Metallurgists and other craftsmen are given a special status in Yamnaya society, and metal objects are sometimes found in large quantities in elite graves. New metalworking technologies and weapon designs are used.

Diet stable isotope ratios of Yamna individuals from the Dnipro Valley suggest the Yamna diet was terrestrial protein based with insignificant contribution from freshwater or aquatic resources. Anthony speculates that the Yamnaya ate a diet consisting of meat, milk, yogurt, cheese, and soups made from seeds and wild vegetables, and probably consumed mead. 

Mallory and Adams suggest that Yamnaya society may have had a tripartite structure of three differentiated social classes, although the evidence available does not demonstrate the existence of specific classes such as priests, warriors, and farmers.

Archaeogenetics 

According to Jones et al. (2015) and Haak et al. (2015), autosomal tests indicate that the Yamnaya people were the result of a genetic admixture between two different hunter-gatherer populations: distinctive "Eastern Hunter-Gatherers" (EHG), from Eastern Europe, with high affinity to the Mal'ta–Buret' culture or other, closely related people from Siberia and a population of "Caucasus hunter-gatherers" (CHG) who probably arrived from the Caucasus or Iran. Each of those two populations contributed about half the Yamnaya DNA. This admixture is referred to in archaeogenetics as Western Steppe Herder (WSH) ancestry.

Admixture between EHGs and CHGs is believed to have occurred on the eastern Pontic-Caspian steppe starting around 5,000 BC, while admixture with Early European Farmers (EEF) happened in the southern parts of the Pontic-Caspian steppe sometime later. More recent genetic studies have found that the Yamnaya were a mixture of EHGs, CHGs, and to a lesser degree Anatolian farmers and Levantine farmers, but not EEFs from Europe due to lack of WHG DNA in the Yamnaya. This occurred in two distinct admixture events from West Asia into the Pontic-Caspian steppe.

Haplogroup R1b, especially subclades of R1b-M269, is the most common Y-DNA haplogroup found among both the Yamnaya and modern-day Western Europeans. Additionally, a minority are found to belong to haplogroup I2. They are found to belong to a wider variety of mtDNA haplogroups, including  U, T, and haplogroups associated with Caucasus Hunter-Gatherers and Early European Farmers.

People of the Yamnaya culture are believed to have had mostly brown eye colour, light to intermediate skin, and brown hair colour, with some variation. A 2022 study by Lazaridis et al. found that the typical phenotype among the Yamnaya population was brown eyes, brown hair, and intermediate skin colour. None of the Yamnaya samples were predicted to have either blue eyes or blonde hair. Some individuals are believed to have carried a mutation to the KITLG gene associated with blond hair, as several individuals with Steppe ancestry are later found to carry this mutation. The Ancient North Eurasian population, who contributed significant ancestry to Western Steppe Herders, are believed to be the source of this mutation. A study in 2015 found that Yamnaya had the highest ever calculated genetic selection for height of any of the ancient populations tested. It has been hypothesized that an allele associated with lactase persistence (conferring lactose tolerance into adulthood) was brought to Europe from the steppe by Yamnaya-related migrations.

The geneticist David Reich has argued that the genetic data supports the likelihood that the people of the Yamnaya culture were a "single, genetically coherent group" who were responsible for spreading many Indo-European languages. Reich's group recently suggested that the source of Anatolian and Indo-European subfamilies of the Proto-Indo-European (PIE) language was in west Asia and the Yamna were responsible for the dissemination of the latter. Reich also argues that the genetic evidence shows that Yamnaya society was an oligarchy dominated by a small number of elite males.  

The genetic evidence for the extent of the role of the Yamnaya culture in the spread of Indo-European languages has however been questioned by Russian archaeologist Leo Klejn and Balanovsky et al., who note a lack of male haplogroup continuity between the people of the Yamnaya culture and the contemporary populations of Europe. Klejn has also suggested that the autosomal evidence does not support a Yamnaya migration, arguing that Western Steppe Herder ancestry in both contemporary and Bronze Age samples is lowest around the Danube in Hungary, near the western limits of the Yamnaya culture, and highest in Northern Europe, which Klejn argues is the opposite of what would be expected if the geneticists' hypothesis is correct.

Language 

Marija Gimbutas identified the Yamnaya culture with the late Proto-Indo-Europeans (PIE) in her Kurgan hypothesis. The Pontic-Caspian steppe is the strongest candidate for the Urheimat (original homeland) of the Proto-Indo-European language, and evidence from linguistics and genetics suggests that the Yamnaya culture may be the homeland of the core Indo-European languages, excluding the Anatolian languages.

According to David W. Anthony, the genetic evidence suggests that the leading clans of the Yamnaya were of EHG (Eastern European hunter-gatherer) and WHG (Western European hunter-gatherer) paternal origin and implies that the Indo-European languages were the result of "a dominant language spoken by EHGs that absorbed Caucasus-like elements in phonology, morphology, and lexicon." It has also been suggested that the PIE language evolved through trade interactions in the circum-Pontic area in the 4th millennium BCE, mediated by the Yamna predecessors in the North Pontic steppe.

Yamnaya-related migrations

Western Europe 

Haak et al. (2015) conducted a genome-wide study of 69 ancient skeletons from Europe and Russia. They concluded that Yamnaya autosomal characteristics are very close to the Corded Ware culture people, with an estimated 73% ancestral contribution from the Yamnaya DNA in the DNA of Corded Ware skeletons from Germany. The same study estimated a (38.8–50.4 %) ancestral contribution of the Yamnaya in the DNA of modern Central, and Northern Europeans, and an 18.5–32.6 % contribution in modern Southern Europeans; this contribution is found to a lesser extent in Sardinians (2.4–7.1 %) and Sicilians (5.9–11.6 %). Haak et al. also note that their results state that haplogroup R-M269 spread into Europe from the East after 3000 BC. Studies that analysed ancient human remains in Ireland and Portugal support the thesis that R-M269 was introduced in these places along with autosomal DNA from the Eastern European steppes.

Autosomal tests also indicate that the Yamnaya are the vector for "Ancient North Eurasian" admixture into Europe. "Ancient North Eurasian" is the name given in literature to a genetic component that represents descent from the people of the Mal'ta–Buret' culture or a population closely related to them. That genetic component is visible in tests of the Yamnaya people as well as modern-day Europeans.

Eastern Europe and Finland 

In the Baltic, Jones et al. (2017) found that the Neolithic transition – the passage from a hunter-gatherer economy to a farming-based economy – coincided with the arrival en masse of individuals with Yamnaya-like ancestry. This is different from what happened in Western and Southern Europe, where the Neolithic transition was caused by a population that came from Anatolia, with Pontic steppe ancestry being detected from only the late Neolithic onward.

Per Haak et al. (2015), the Yamnaya contribution in the modern populations of Eastern Europe ranges from 46.8% among Russians to 42.8% in Ukrainians. Finland has one of the highest Yamnaya contributions in all of Europe (50.4%).

Central and South Asia 

Studies also point to the strong presence of Yamnaya descent in the current nations of South Asia, especially in groups that are referred to as Indo-Aryans. According to Pathak et al. (2018), the "North-Western Indian & Pakistani" populations (PNWI) showed significant Middle-Late Bronze Age Steppe (Steppe_MLBA) ancestry along with Yamnaya Early-Middle Bronze Age (Steppe_EMBA) ancestry, but the Indo-Europeans of Gangetic Plains and Dravidian people only showed significant Yamnaya (Steppe_EMBA) ancestry and no Steppe_MLBA. The study also noted that ancient south Asian samples had significantly higher Steppe_MLBA than Steppe_EMBA (or Yamnaya). The study identified the Rors and Jats as the population in South Asia with the highest proportion of Steppe ancestry. Lazaridis et al. (2016) estimated (6.5–50.2 %) steppe-related admixture in South Asians, though the proportion of Steppe ancestry varies widely across ethnic groups. According to Narasimhan et al. (2019), the Yamnaya-related ancestry, termed Western_Steppe_EMBA, that reached central and south Asia was not the initial expansion from the steppe to the east, but a secondary expansion that involved a group possessing ~67% Western_Steppe_EMBA ancestry and ~33% ancestry from the European cline. This group included people similar to that of Corded Ware, Srubnaya, Petrovka, and Sintashta. Moving further east in the central steppe, it acquired ~9% ancestry from a group of people that possessed West Siberian Hunter Gatherer ancestry, thus forming the Central Steppe MLBA cluster, which is the primary source of steppe ancestry in South Asia, contributing up to 30% of the ancestry of the modern groups in the region.

According to Unterländer et al. (2017), all Iron Age Scythian Steppe nomads can best be described as a mixture of Yamnaya-related ancestry and an East Asian-related component, which most closely corresponds to the modern North Siberian Nganasan people of the lower Yenisey River, to varying degrees, but generally higher among Eastern Scythians.

Artifacts

See also 

 Kurgan
 Kurgan stelae
 Butmir culture
 Vinča culture
 Beaker culture
 Baden culture
 Botai culture
 Khvalynsk culture
 Mamai-Hora
 Samara culture
 Sintashta culture
 Yersinia pestis
 Proto-Indo-Europeans
 Indigenous Aryanism

Notes

References

Notes

Sources 

 
 
 
 
 
 
 
 
 
 
 
 
 
 
 
  Supplementary Information

External links 

 
 

Indo-European archaeological cultures
Archaeological cultures of Eastern Europe
Bronze Age cultures of Europe
Chalcolithic cultures of Europe
Archaeological cultures in Ukraine
Archaeological cultures in Russia
Archaeological cultures in Moldova
Archaeology of Kazakhstan
4th millennium BC
Prehistoric Russia